Hagi, Hadži, or Hadzhi (Хаджи) is a name derived from hajji, an honorific title given to a Muslim person who has successfully completed the Hajj to Mecca, which was later adopted by Christian peoples as a word for pilgrim.

People

Surname
 Dimitri Atanasescu Hagi Sterjio (1836–1907), Aromanian teacher at the first Romanian school in the Balkans for the Aromanians
 Gheorghe Hagi (1965–), Romanian footballer and manager
 Kira Hagi (1996–), daughter of Gheorghe Hagi and Romanian actress
 Ianis Hagi (1998–), son of Gheorghe Hagi and Romanian footballer
 Jovan Hadži (1884–1972), zoologist
 Mihali Adami Hagi (1754–1825), Aromanian scholar, better known as Daniel Moscopolites

Given name
 Hadzhi Dimitar, (1840–1868), Bulgarian revolutionary
 Hadzhi Hristo (1821-1829), Bulgarian revolutionary (bg)
 Hadži Mustafa Pasha (1733—1801), Ottoman commander
 Hadži-Prodan (1760–1825), Serbian voivode

Other
 Japanese bush clover or Lespedeza
 Hagi, Yamaguchi, a city in Japan
 Hagi ware, a type of pottery originating in Hagi
 Japanese destroyer Hagi

See also
 Hajji (name)
 Hadji
 Hajji (disambiguation)
 Hatzi
 Hadžić
 Hadzhiev
 Yordan Hadzhikonstantinov-Dzhinot
 Hadžići

Aromanian-language surnames
Bulgarian-language surnames
Romanian-language surnames